Saint Thomas' Chapel is a historic Episcopal chapel located at Amagansett in the Town of East Hampton, Suffolk County, New York.  It was built in 1907 as a summer use chapel without heating or plumbing.  The predominant feature of the building is the steep gable roof that sweeps around the three-sided apse at the south end.

It was listed on the National Register of Historic Places in 1997.

References

External links
St. Thomas' Chapel website

Episcopal church buildings in New York (state)
Properties of religious function on the National Register of Historic Places in New York (state)
Shingle Style church buildings
Gothic Revival church buildings in New York (state)
Churches in Suffolk County, New York
National Register of Historic Places in Suffolk County, New York
Shingle Style architecture in New York (state)